Lucius Floyd is a former Grey Cup champion and award-winning running back in the Canadian Football League.

Floyd played his college football at University of Nevada, Reno. He teamed with Charvez Foger, to form one of the school's most explosive running back combinations. In 1986, he rushed for 1066 yards, 305 of them coming in a single-game against Montana State University on September 27 (second highest total in school history).

He joined the CFL's Saskatchewan Roughriders in 1990, and his 421 rushing yards and 73 catches for 811 yards (and 5 touchdowns) won him the Jackie Parker Trophy for best rookie in the Western Conference. In 1991, he rushed for 677 yards and in 1992 another 373 yards (and 1471 in total as a Green Rider), but he was traded to the Edmonton Eskimos part way thru the 1993 season.  Good fortune shined on Floyd, as he starred in the Esks' 1993 Grey Cup championship, scoring a touchdown.

He played 2 more seasons in Edmonton, and he had a 100-yard touchdown reception on July 7, 1995 against Saskatchewan, and his 2606 all purpose yards in 1994 are second only to Gizmo Williams in team history. He finished his career in 1995 with the Memphis Mad Dogs where he rushed for 21 yards.

References

1966 births
Living people
Nevada Wolf Pack football players
Saskatchewan Roughriders players
Edmonton Elks players
Memphis Mad Dogs players
Canadian Football League Rookie of the Year Award winners